Yeghvard FC, is a defunct Armenian football club from the town of Yeghvard, Kotayk Province. 

The club was founded in 1986, However, it was dissolved in 1996 and is no longer active in professional football.

League record

References

Association football clubs established in 1986
Association football clubs disestablished in 1996
Yeghvard
1986 establishments in Armenia
1996 disestablishments in Armenia